John Charles Jennings (10 February 1903 – 17 June 1990) was a Conservative Party politician in the United Kingdom.  He was the Member of Parliament (MP) for Burton from the 1955 general election until his retirement at the February 1974 general election.

References

External links 
 

1903 births
1990 deaths
Conservative Party (UK) MPs for English constituencies
National Union of Teachers-sponsored MPs
UK MPs 1955–1959
UK MPs 1959–1964
UK MPs 1964–1966
UK MPs 1966–1970
UK MPs 1970–1974